Phytoecia bohemani is a species of beetle in the family Cerambycidae. It was described by Francis Polkinghorne Pascoe in 1858, originally under the genus Saperda. It is known from South Africa.

References

Phytoecia
Beetles described in 1858